The Wake Forest Demon Deacons women's basketball team represents Wake Forest in women's basketball. The school competes in the Atlantic Coast Conference in Division I of the National Collegiate Athletic Association (NCAA). The Demon Deacons play home basketball games at Lawrence Joel Veterans Memorial Coliseum in Winston-Salem, North Carolina.

Season-by-season record
The Demon Deacons have a 591–748 all-time record through the 2019–20 season. They have two appearances in the NCAA Tournament (1988 & 2021), and an overall record of 1–2.

NCAA tournament results

WNIT results
The Demon Deacons have appeared in the Women's National Invitation Tournament (WNIT) seven times. They have a combined record of 6-7.

References

External links